Lapuz may refer to:

 Lapuz, Iloilo City, in the Philippines
 Jose David Lapuz, a member-commissioner of the UNESCO National Commission of the Philippines 
 Renaldo Lapuz, a Filipino-American who auditioned on American Idol